Barbara Kolar (born 18 April 1970) is a Croatian actress, television presenter at the Croatian Radiotelevision and the radio presenter at Antena Zagreb. She is the most famous for hosting the Ples sa zvijezdama and Zvijezde pjevaju shows. She hosts Antena Zagreb's Jutarnji Show ("Morning Show"). She starred in the HRT series Bitange i princeze ("Punks and princesses"), Stipe u gostima ("Stipe's visit") and Naša mala klinika ("Our little clinic"), and is the host of the quiz show Upitnik ("Questionnaire").

TV appearances

Series roles 
 Bitange i princeze as police officer (2009)
 Stipe u gostima as herself (2009)
 Naša mala klinika as herself (2007)

Hostings 
 Život je lijep (2015–2016)
 Ja to mogu (2015)
 30 u hladu (2009)
 Malo misto (2005–present)
 Kruške i jabuke (2000)

References

1970 births
Living people
Croatian television presenters
Croatian women television presenters
People from Čakovec